Lilian Douglas was a British stage and film actress. She starred in fourteen films during the silent era.

Selected filmography
 When Greek Meets Greek (1922)
 A Master of Craft (1922)
 A Sporting Double (1922)
 The Sporting Instinct (1922)
 Paddy the Next Best Thing (1923)
 The Hypocrites (1923)
 In the Blood (1923)
 The Hound of the Deep (1926)

References

Bibliography
 Low, Rachael. The History of the British Film 1918-1929. George Allen & Unwin, 1971.

External links

Year of birth unknown
Year of death unknown
British stage actresses
British film actresses
20th-century British actresses